The Detroit Film Critics Society Award for Best Film is an annual award given by the Detroit Film Critics Society to honor the best film made that year.

Winners 

Legend:

 † indicates the winner of the Academy Award for Best Picture.

2000s

2010s

2020s

References

Detroit Film Critics Society Awards
Awards for best film
Lists of films by award